Sunneva Einarsdóttir (born 1990)  is an Icelandic team handball goalkeeper. She plays on the Icelandic national team, and participated at the 2011 World Women's Handball Championship in Brazil.

References

1996 births
Living people
Sunneva Einarsdottir